Robert or Bob Morton may refer to:

 Robert Morton Organ Company, a pipe organ manufacturer in the U.S.

People
 Robert Morton (MP), in 1361, MP for Nottinghamshire
 Robert Morton (died 1424), MP for Nottinghamshire
 Robert Morton (bishop) (1435–1497), Bishop of Worcester
 Robert Morton (composer) (1430–1479), English composer of early Renaissance music
 Bob Morton (Australian footballer) (1944–1995), Australian rules footballer for St Kilda
 Bob Morton (footballer, born 1906) (1906–1990), English football player for several clubs
 Bob Morton (footballer, born 1927) (1927–2002), English football player for Luton Town
 Bob Morton (Scottish footballer) (1891–1948), Scottish footballer
 Bob Morton (naturist), American naturist
 Robert Morton (producer), American television producer known for his work on Late Night with David Letterman
 Bob Morton (politician) (1934–2015), State Senator from Washington state, USA
 Robert W. Morton (1937–2002), Royal Canadian Air Force officer
 Robert Morton (biochemist) (1920–1963), Australian biochemist

Characters
 Dr. Robert Morton, a character on the 1960s U.S. show Peyton Place (TV series)
 Bob Morton, an OCP executive in the 1987 film RoboCop

See also
 Robert Moreton (1922–1957), English comedian